Mangué Cissé Djibrila (17 November 1945 – 30 September 2009) was an Ivorian footballer who played as a defender. In 1970 he reached to semi-final of the Africa Cup of Nations. He died on 30 September 2009 after long-term disease. He had seven children, the youngest of whom is French international, Djibril Cissé.

References 

1945 births
2009 deaths
Ivorian footballers
Ivory Coast international footballers
Ivorian expatriate footballers
Expatriate footballers in France
Association football defenders
Ligue 2 players
ASEC Mimosas players
FC Martigues players
Footballers from Abidjan